Asante Cleveland (born March 21, 1992) is a former American football tight end. He played college football at the University of Miami and attended Christian Brothers High School in Sacramento, California. He has been a member of the San Francisco 49ers, New England Patriots, and San Diego / Los Angeles Chargers.

Early years
Cleveland played high school football for the Christian Brothers High School Falcons. He earned all-league honors as a junior after leading the team with 21 receptions for 262 yards and four touchdowns. He recorded 24 receptions for 412 yards and seven touchdowns during his senior year.

College career
Cleveland played from 2010 to 2013 for the Miami Hurricanes.

Professional career

San Francisco 49ers
Cleveland was signed by the San Francisco 49ers on May 10, 2014, after going undrafted in the 2014 NFL Draft. He was released by the 49ers on August 30 and signed to the team's practice squad on August 31, 2014. He was promoted to the active roster on September 20, 2014. Cleveland made his NFL debut on September 21, 2014, against the Arizona Cardinals.

New England Patriots
Cleveland was traded to the New England Patriots for Jordan Devey on August 18, 2015. He was released by the Patriots on September 5 and signed to the team's practice squad on September 6, 2015. He was promoted to the active roster on November 27, 2015 and appeared briefly, recording one catch for one yard, in the Patriots' 30–24 loss to the Denver Broncos on November 29, 2015. Cleveland was released by the Patriots on December 25, 2015.

San Diego / Los Angeles Chargers
Cleveland signed with the San Diego Chargers on December 28, 2015. On September 4, 2016, he was released by the Chargers. He was then signed to the Chargers' practice squad. He was promoted to the active roster on September 24, 2016.

On August 7, 2017, Cleveland was waived/injured by the Chargers and placed on injured reserve.

References

Living people
1992 births
Players of American football from Sacramento, California
American football tight ends
African-American players of American football
Miami Hurricanes football players
San Diego Chargers players
San Francisco 49ers players
New England Patriots players
Los Angeles Chargers players
21st-century African-American sportspeople